Krishna Balaji Sainis (born 2 October 1949) is an Indian immunologist. He is a former senior professor of Life Sciences at Homi Bhabha National Institute and an elected fellow of the National Academy of Sciences, India. Since 1999, he has served as the Indian representative on the United Nations Scientific Committee on the Effects of Atomic Radiation. The Council of Scientific and Industrial Research, the apex agency of the Government of India for scientific research, awarded him the Shanti Swarup Bhatnagar Prize for Science and Technology for his contributions to medical sciences in 1994.

Biography 

Born on 2 October 1949, K. B. Sainis earned a master's degree in biochemistry (MSc) from Savitribai Phule Pune University and did a one-year course in biology and radiobiology at Bhabha Atomic Research Centre (BARC). Upon completion of the course in 1972, he joined BARC as a Scientific Officer while continuing his doctoral studies at Pune University and secured a PhD in biophysics in 1980. Taking a sabbatical, he did his post-doctoral studies at the New England Medical Centre of Tufts University School of Medicine and, with the assistance of an IAEA fellowship, he completed his studies at University College London at its ICRF Tumor Immunology Unit.

Returning to BARC, he served in many positions, heading the Immunology Section and the Cell Biology Division and serving as the associate director of the Bioscience Group. He became director of the Bio-Medical Group in 2006, with the responsibility of six divisions. During his service at BARC, he has also been working as a faculty at the department of Life Sciences of the Homi Bhabha National Institute where he is a senior professor.

Sainis is married to Jayashree Krishna Sainis, a biochemist, and the family lives in Navi Mumbai.

Research 
Sainis' studies in immunobiology have covered how T Cells and their receptors influence immune response to DNA in mycobacterial antigens and lupus nephritis, an autoimmune disease. He headed a group of scientists at BARC who were involved in research on immunomodulators based on plants. His studies have been documented and cited in texts and articles. He has also written chapters in books published by others.

Affiliations and memberships
Sainis has been associated with two international agencies. He served as president of the Standing Advisory Group on Nuclear Applications (SAGNA) of the International Atomic Energy Agency (IAEA) in 2012, and since 1999 has served as the Indian representative on the United Nations Scientific Committee on the Effects of Atomic Radiation.

Sainis is the president of the Mumbai Immunology Group at Advanced Centre for Treatment, Research and Education in Cancer (ACTREC) of the Tata Memorial Centre and a former vice president of the Maharashtra Academy of Sciences. He is an honorary adviser to the Society for Free Radical Research India (SFRR-India); a member of the Advisory Committee of the National Training Program on Radiation Processing of Food for Food and Quarantine Inspectors & Quality Control Personnel organized by Department of Atomic Energy in association with BARC in February 2013; and a member of the Indian Immunology Society.

He was previously associated with ongoing education programs such as the XVII Training Workshop on Radiation Emergency Preparedness for Medical Officers, the Refresher Course 2013 of the Indian Women Scientists Association, and the AKRUTI Technology Package for Rural Deployment of BARC. He has delivered several invited speeches or keynote addresses and is a reviewer for Hindawi journals.

Awards and honors 
The Council of Scientific and Industrial Research awarded Sainis the Shanti Swarup Bhatnagar Prize, one of the highest Indian science awards, in 1994. The National Academy of Sciences, India elected him as a fellow in 2002. He is also an elected fellow of the Maharashtra Academy of Sciences.

Selected bibliography

Chapters

Articles

See also 
 Immunotherapy
 Radioactive contamination

Notes

References

External links

Further reading 
 

Indian immunologists
Indian medical writers
1949 births
Scientists from Maharashtra
Savitribai Phule Pune University alumni
Tufts University School of Medicine alumni
Alumni of University College London
Homi Bhabha National Institute
Recipients of the Shanti Swarup Bhatnagar Award in Medical Science
Fellows of The National Academy of Sciences, India
Living people